The following is a list of main stadiums used in the international rugby union competition, Super Rugby, in which teams from Australia, Fiji, New Zealand and the Pacific Islands participate. Stadiums are current as of ahead of 2023 Super Rugby Pacific season. The Drua are yet to confirm their stadiums for the 2023 season, having played the 2022 season in Australia due to the COVID-19 pandemic. Stadiums are listed in order of size of capacity, and use their most recent sponsored Super Rugby name.

* Italics denote a former use of a Primary or Secondary stadium.

2023 Primary stadiums

2023 Secondary stadiums

Former stadiums
The following list includes all former Super Rugby stadiums used from the 1996 season to the end of the 2022 season. The list does not include any stadium currently used as a primary or secondary stadium.

See also

 List of Australian rugby union stadiums by capacity
 List of rugby union stadiums by capacity
 List of rugby union stadiums in France
 List of English rugby union stadiums by capacity

References

External links

Stadiums
Lists of stadiums
Rugby union stadiums
Lists of sports venues with capacity
Lists of sports venues in Australia